CP-154,526 is a potent and selective antagonist of the corticotropin releasing hormone receptor 1 developed by Pfizer.

CP-154,526 is under investigation for the potential treatment of alcoholism.

See also 
 Antalarmin
 Pexacerfont
 Corticotropin releasing hormone antagonist

References

Further reading

External links 
 

Anxiolytics
Corticotropin-releasing hormone antagonists
Pyrrolopyrimidines
Pfizer brands